Ikhtiar Wali Khan is a Pakistani politician from Nowshera District who had been a member of the Provincial Assembly of Khyber Pakhtunkhwa from February 2021 till January 2023.

Political career
He was elected to the Provincial Assembly of Khyber Pakhtunkhwa as a candidate of Pakistan Muslim League-N from Constituency PK-63 (Nowshera-III) in 2021 by-election

References

Living people
Year of birth missing (living people)
Pakistani politicians
Khyber Pakhtunkhwa MPAs 2018–2023
Pakistan Muslim League (N) politicians
Pakistan Muslim League (N) MPAs (Khyber Pakhtunkhwa)